The Tiefwarensee Ice Age Trail runs around the Tiefwarensee lake on the northeastern perimeter of the town of Waren (Müritz) in the district of Mecklenburgische Seenplatte in the German state of Mecklenburg-Western Pomerania. The ten-kilometre-long path may be negotiated on foot or by bicycle. It is element D8 of the Mecklenburg Ice Age Landscape Geopark (Geopark Mecklenburgische Eiszeitlandschaft).

Trail 
Lake Müritz and the Tiefwarensee, like the rest of the Mecklenburg Lake District, were shaped by the last ice age. The various stages can be viewed here as if in a model of the region. "With the geopark project we want to make this natural geological heritage much more accessible to the public than hitherto and to make it a useful element of the region's touristic development", according to the Geopark's internet site.

Stations on the trail 
According to the overview map there are 17 stations with information boards:
 The information boards begin at the cemetery (Friedhof) car park.
 Stüde Ice House : In former times, blocks of ice were sawn from the Tiefwarensee in winter, stored in an ice cellar and taken away during the course of the year for use in the fisheries and breweries. Today there is a good view of the lake from the roof of the ice cellar.
 Hohlweg - Werderweg crosstracks: at this spot there was a pre-Roman Iron Age settlement. There are also traces of a sacrificial altar on which cattle were sacrificed. The bridge here runs over the meltwater tributary from the Melzer See to the Tiefwarensee.

 Schwalbenberg Bathing Site
 Lakeshore Terrace after the Werder-Siedlung: In this part of the Ostufer Tiefwaren – Falkenhäger Bruch Nature Reserve there are species-rich wet woodlands and a hazel coppice as well as a beech wood.

 Geological features (sandur): On the site of the Tiefwarensee dead ice was once covered by sandur that was pushed over it. The present lake hollow subsided with the melting away of the ice. The meltwaters escaped from the inland ice under high pressure. As the streams broadened they lost speed. Because their transport capacity was no longer sufficient, the material they carried with them was deposited as sediment. This included glacial erratics as well as fine-grained material.

 Geological features (terminal moraines): At this station glacial till (Geschiebemergel) and fine-grained silt (Schluff) may be seen. The terms ground moraine (Grundmoräne), ablation moraine (Ablationsmoräne) and push moraine (Stauchendmoräne) are explained. A distinction is made between recessional or deposited end moraines (Satzendmoräne, material left behind by the inland ice when the ice melts) and push moraines (Stauchendmoräne, till heaped up ahead of the glacier during its advance).
 Wolfsschlucht ("Wolf Gorge"): part of the ice age terminal moraine ridge with an imposing and species-rich beech wood. This is a Ratskamp (a plot of land whose income went to the Waren town council). The name Wolfsschlucht was probably coined during the Romantic period (19th century).

 Observation tower: from the observation tower at this station there is a view over the Tiefwarensee and the terminal moraine landscape, which lies in front of the glacial lake.

 Klinik Amsee: Von der Klinik  there is a view of the Tiefwarensee from the northwest.
 Warener Buchen ("Waren Beeches"): The beech trees here are on a terminal moraine ridge on the edge of the Tiefwarensee.
 Pommersche Wiese ("Pomeranian Meadow"): Here there are rare plants including orchids.
 Bungenberg ("Bungen Hill"): fisherman used to dry their Bungen (= weirs made of wattle) on this hill .
 Mühlenberg ("Mill Hill"): several windmills used to stand here, hence the name. Today it is the site of folk festivals and the open-air stage.
 Kegelbahn car park: this is also a good place to leave the car and start the circular walk.
 Boat hire: boats may be hired here for those who want to see the ice age landscape from the waters of the Tiefwarensee.
 Promenade – southern shore of the Tiefwarensee: From the heights of the promenade there is a panoramic view from the south over the Tiefwarensee.

Maps 
 Geological map of the Mecklenburg Lake District Ice Age Route (pdf file; 2.1 MB)

Literature 
 On the internet site of the Ice Age Geopark there is a comprehensive list of current literature under the point "Publikationen"

References

External links 
 Geo-experiences of the Mecklenburg Ice Age Landscape
 Ice Age Traces in the Mecklenburg Landscape
 Tiefwarensee Ice Age Nature Trail on the geosite of the University of Greifswald

Hiking trails in Germany
Cycleways in Germany
Waren (Müritz)